is a scrolling shooter video game for the Sega/Mega CD. It was developed by Victor Entertainment and first published in Japan in 1993, and later in Europe and North America in 1994. A sequel, Keio Flying Squadron 2, was released in 1996.

The game refers to Japanese culture, both ancient and modern simultaneously.

Plot
The game is set in the Edo Shogunate era of Japanese history (1865–1868). Rami Nana-Hikari, a seemingly typical teenager, has been the keeper of the Key to the Secret Treasure, and is really a descendant of aliens who came to Earth in ancient times. She does not know the importance of the Treasure, and her overbearing grandmother does not remember what secret the Key unlocks. The Key has been stolen (while Rami was at the local mini-mart, a common hangout for teens then), and now she must get the Key back.

Wearing her bunny girl costume, Rami rides into battle on her trusty dragon, Spot, as she encounters various enemies such as a sea monster, the U.S. Navy, the Russian Army, and the Seven Gods of the Good Fortune, until she arrives at the ship of Dr. Pon Eho, a raccoon billed as the most intelligent creature on Earth with an IQ of 1400, his appearance being appropriate for the thief that he is.

This game features animated cutscenes provided by Studio Pierrot.

Gameplay
The game consists of Rami riding on top of Spot, who can shoot fireballs at enemies. When Spot is not firing, two smaller dragons (companion fighters) appear one after another to assist Rami and Spot. The lesser dragons shoot smaller fireballs and can be sacrificed to do larger damage, only to reappear when Spot ceases to shoot.

Characters
Japanese names are given in the western order, given name first.

Rami Nana-Hikari - Grandchild of an ancient family with the mission of guarding the Key that opens the Ark, Rami wears a traditional kimono at the beginning of the game, and later changes into the "Super Ultra Cute Battle Suit", complete with bunny ears and tail. In the English version of the game she is 20 years old, while in the Japanese version she is 14 years old. Voiced by Miho Kanno (Japanese); Samantha Paris (English).
Spot Nana-Hikari - Rami's pet dragon, always loyal but as lazy as his owner. Spot has no problems with flying and shooting fireballs. Spot is called Pochi in the Japanese release of the game. Voiced by Akiko Hiramatsu (Japanese); Samantha Paris (English).
"Grandma" and "Grandpa" Nana-Hikari - Rami's biological grandparents who have raised her from a young age and have brought her up to be the next keeper of the Secret Treasure. They were former keepers themselves, continuing a long line of ancestors in their clan that have kept the Treasure safe for many generations. They are now retired, and have passed the job to Rami. Grandma is a rather harsh person who does not take lightly to Rami acting like a slob, and Grandpa is just a little dopey. If Rami does not defend the Secret Treasure, it is quite doubtful Grandma will ever let her eat dinner in their house again. Voiced by Keiko Yamamoto (Japanese; Grandma), Yusaku Yara (Japanese; Grandpa); Roger L. Jackson (English; both).
Dr. Pon Eho - A super intelligent raccoon who stole the Key to the Secret Treasure. His IQ is 1400. He is a member of Greenpeace. Voiced by Jōji Yanami (Japanese); Roger L. Jackson (English).
Narrator - Voiced by Yusaku Yara (Japanese); Roger L. Jackson (English).

Release
Keio Flying Squadron was released on August 6, 1993, in Japan, and on November 10, 1994, in North America by Victor Entertainment. In the United Kingdom, a playable demo disc for Keio Flying Squadron containing the first stage was provided by the Sega Pro CD magazine in its December 1994 issue. While the demo ends after the first stage, it is identical to the full version, and the whole game is accessible in the demo disc by using a level select cheat code.

Reception
M! Games reviewed the game, giving it a score of 71 out of 100.

Next Generation reviewed the game, rating it two stars out of five, and stated that "The game received an extra star because a few bits actually made us laugh, but that's it."

The game has appeared on multiple top lists of Mega CD games. Retro Gamer included among top ten Mega CD games, calling it "a perfectly acceptable substitute" of Konami's Parodius that features "similar style of horizontally scrolling wackiness and puts the Mega-CD hardware to good use to produce some excellent cut-scenes and a brilliant CD-quality soundtrack."

References

External links

1993 video games
Video games about dragons
Sega CD games
Sega CD-only games
Science fantasy video games
Horizontally scrolling shooters
Single-player video games
Video games developed in Japan
Video games featuring female protagonists
Video games scored by Tsukasa Tawada
Video games set in feudal Japan
Video games set in the 19th century